The architecture of Casablanca is diverse and historically significant. Casablanca, Morocco's economic capital, has a rich urban history and is home to many notable buildings in a variety of styles. Throughout the 20th century, architecture and urban development in Casablanca evolved in a way that was simultaneously specific to the city's contexts, and consonant with international ideas.

Anfa, as the settlement in what is now Casablanca was known, was built by the Romans according to the Descrittione dell’Africa of Leo Africanus. The city is located at the mouth of Wādi Būskūra on the Atlantic Ocean in the Chaouia plain, known as Tamasna under the Barghawata. It was destroyed by the earthquake of 1755 and rebuilt by Sultan Muhammad III of Morocco, who employed European architects, and it was renamed Ad-dār al-Bayḍā. The , the medina walls, and the two oldest mosques date back to this period.

The 1906 Algeciras Conference gave the French holding company  permission to build a modern port in Casablanca. One of the first French constructions was a clock tower in the likeness of a minaret, an early example of a style called , which would characterize much of Casablanca's architecture in the early colonial period, particularly civic and administrative buildings.

Under the French Protectorate officially established in 1912, the resident general Hubert Lyautey employed Henri Prost in the urban planning of Casablanca. Many buildings in Art Nouveau and Art Deco were designed by architects such as Marius Boyer in the  through the 1930s, while the French colonial apparatus experimented with the urban planning of neighborhoods such as the Hubous and the Bousbir. 

The  style or Streamline Moderne, which architects such as Edmond Brion embraced in the 1930s, indicated a transition toward Modern architecture. In the 1940s, Michel Écochard took over urban planning and focused on a linear plan with industrial development to the east and housing projects to address overpopulation, such as those at Carrières Centrales. This approach is called vernacular modernism.

Elie Azagury became the first Moroccan modernist architect and led the GAMMA after Morocco's independence from France in 1956. He and his colleague Jean-François Zevaco were among the most important architects in Casablanca in the later 20th century. They, along with  Abdeslam Faraoui and Patrice de Mazières, experimented with Brutalist architecture. The architecture of Casablanca at the turn of the 20th century was influenced by the politics of Neoliberalism.

Traditional Moroccan 

Casablanca retains many authentic examples of traditional Moroccan architecture, particularly within the city walls of the historic Medina of Ad-Dār Al-Bayḍāʾ. There are a number of aḍriħa (mausolea) including those of Sidi Allal al-Qairawani and Sidi Belyout. Casablanca was one of a number of cities—including Essaouira, Marrakesh, and Rabat—that were revitalized after the earthquake of 1755, by Sultan Mohammed ben Abdallah—who Abdallah Laroui called "the architect of modern Morocco." The sultan was known to have used European architects, such as Théodore Cornut and Ahmed el Inglizi, in his projects. The Sqala bastion and the two oldest mosques in the city, the Mosque of the Makhzen and the Walad al-Hamraa Mosque, were built during Sultan Muhammad Ben Abdallah's renovations to the city.

The city's population grew under the protégé system as Europeans settled in the city, and with the migration of Jews from the interior of the country. In 1886, Élisée Reclus described Casablanca as a "European coastal settlement" and "desolate and extremely unhealthy."

In his 1900 map of the city, Dr. Frédéric Weisgerber identified three main parts: the medina, the mellah, and the Tnaker (huts). Casablanca hosted a kissaria, fonduqs, and a fresh produce market along the Wadi Bouskoura stream, at what is now the United Nations Square.

The medina was largely destroyed in the French bombardment of 1907, though several important buildings remain.

Colonial architecture 

The oldest European structure in Casablanca was an abandoned prison allegedly built by the Portuguese, arcades of which now decorate the Arab League Park.

The Church of San Buenaventura (now the Buenaventura Cultural Center) was built in the medina by the Spanish community of Casablanca in 1890.
In 1900, Casablanca had four consulates and thirteen vice-consulates, which replaced others in Mazagan (al-Jadida), Rabat, and Mogador (Essaouira). Many of these consulates were built along the waterfront to be easily accessible. The first of these was the British consulate, established in 1857. The German consulate, originally built as the Belgian consulate in 1900, became the Omar Ibn Abdelaziz Primary School in 1919.

The original clock tower erected by Charles Martial Joseph Dessigny in 1910 was the first structure built by the French after the bombardment and invasion of Casablanca in 1907.

French Protectorate 
Throughout the decades of the French Protectorate (1912-1956), the urban development of Casablanca was "first and foremost driven by [French] economic interests." The city was designed with automotive traffic and eventual industrial complexes—such as the port and railroad lines—in mind.

('new towns'), residential areas built primarily for expatriate populations alongside  ('indigenous towns') throughout the French colonial empire, were designed to be picturesque and to apply principles of modern urban planning. Lyautey's urban strategy in Morocco, shaped by a pragmatist regard toward colonized populations gained through his military experience in Indochina and Madagascar, was to construct  and to leave  virtually untouched, even to subject them to a kind of Orientalist preservation.

Prost's plan 

For the colonial administration, the Moroccan medina was at once a breeding ground of disease to be contained, an antiquity of the past with Oriental charm to be preserved, and a refuge for would-be insurgents to be squelched.

The plan was radio-concentric, like Paris. The main streets radiated southeast from the port, the medina, and the Souq Kbir ( grand market) which became  and is now United Nations Square.
Hippolyte Joseph Delaporte designed the first two major buildings to mark the square: the Paris-Maroc stores (1914) and the  Hotel Excelsior (1918). The former represented the colonial power's conquest of Morocco and commerce in Morocco, and Claude Farrère said of the latter that "meetings of stock exchange, finance, and commerce took place exclusively in the four cafés surrounding it." The Central Market (1917) by Pierre Bousquet was built at the site of the Casablanca Fair of 1915. In 1917, Casablanca became the second city in the world, after New York's 1916 Zoning Resolution, to adopt a comprehensive urban plan.

Hubous 

In 1916, four years after the official establishment of the French protectorate, Prost and Albert Laprade designed a —now known as the Hubous—a new medina near the sultan's palace to the east of the new center.

Bousbir 

It was inspired by the Yoshiwara in Tokyo and operated by a private company called . Albert Laprade first set up a rectangular area with an orthogonal street layout, while  and Edmond Brion manipulated traditional Moroccan forms employed in the Hubous. It was a walled-off enclosure containing 175 residences, 8 cafés, and a dispensary, with regulated movement uniquely through a guarded gate. Up to 700 women—Muslims and Jews—lived in this veritable "prison."

Art Nouveau, Art Deco, and Neo-Moorish

Interwar period 
In addition to Henri Prost, Albert Laprade, Marius Boyer, and Edmond Brion were some of the early planners and architects of the city.

Jewish patrons constructed the overwhelming majority of the tallest buildings in Casablanca during the interwar period. In the view of Jean-Louis Cohen, the vertical thrust of construction led by Jewish patrons was "nothing less than a revenge over the [status of] dhimma. Being able to build the highest structures reflected the new condition of a fully emancipated Jewish bourgeoisie." One notable example of this trend is the Lévy-Bendayan Building designed by Marius Boyer.

The former administrative square, now Muhammad V Square, is surrounded by buildings in a style called Neo-Moorish, which combines Mauro-Andalusi and Art Deco architecture. One of the first buildings to employ this style was Hotel Excelsior, built 1912–1914. It was also used in the Old Abattoirs, an industrial slaughterhouse renovated by Prost in 1922. Neo-Moorish elements were also present in private palaces and residences such as the Glaoui Building.

A patent style was often used in colonial administrative buildings, such as Wilaya Building and Mahkamat al-Pasha in the Hubous, with whitewashed lime plaster and green roof tiles.

The Arab League Park (formerly called Parc Lyautey) is the city's largest public park. On its edge is the Sacred Heart Church of Casablanca. It is no longer in use for religious purposes, but it is open to visitors and is a splendid example of Neo-Gothic architecture.The French government described Casablanca as a "laboratory of urbanism." Morocco's permanent delegation to UNESCO submitted a nomination file to get Casablanca's 20th century architecture classified as a World Heritage Site. Casamémoire is an organization that has been working to protect and promote this architectural heritage since 1995.

Modernism and Brutalism 

Streamline Moderne, or paquebot style, with the aesthetic of ocean liners is present in the Bendahan Building, Villas Paquet, the Liberty Building, and others. Edmond Brion's Bendahan Building, completed in 1935, was an early example.

Casablanca was an early site of Americanization due to the allied landing during Operation Torch in 1942.

Ecochard's Plan 
Michel Écochard, director of urban development from 1946–1953, changed Casablanca's urban plan from Prost's radio-concentric system to a linear system, with expanded industrial zones stretching east through Aïn Sebaâ toward Fedala. There was a focus on managing the city's rapid, rural exodus-driven urbanization through the development of social housing projects.

GAMMA 
At the 1953 Congrès Internationaux d'Architecture Moderne (CIAM), ATBAT-Afrique—the Africa branch of  founded in 1947 by figures including Le Corbusier, Vladimir Bodiansky, and André Wogenscky—prepared a study of Casablanca's bidonvilles entitled "Habitat for the Greatest Number." Georges Candilis and Michel Ecochard, the presenters, argued against the doctrine that architects must consider local culture and climate in their designs. This generated great debate among modernist architects around the world and eventually provoked a schism.

Ecochard's collective of Modernist architects was called  (GAMMA), and initially included the architects George Candillis, Alexis Josic and Shadrach Woods. In the early 1950s, Écochard commissioned GAMMA to design housing that provided a "culturally specific living tissue" for laborers and migrants from the countryside. Sémiramis,  (Honeycomb), and Carrières Centrales were some of the first examples of this Vernacular Modernism. Ecochard's 8x8 meter model, designed to address Casablanca's issues with overpopulation and rural exodus, was pioneering in the architecture of collective housing.

Elie Azagury, the first Moroccan modernist architect, led GAMMA after Morocco regained its independence in 1956. Azagury—young, controversial, and an outspoken Communist—was active in Hay Hassani designing cités, modular public housing units, that combined elements of modern and vernacular architecture taking local culture and lifestyles into account.
He and colleagues such as Jean-François Zevaco were also involved in designing experimental private villas in neighborhoods in western Casablanca such as Anfa and Ain Diab with inspiration from Richard Neutra and Oscar Niemeyer. Villa Suissa (now converted into a Paul café), Villa Benkirane, Villa Camembert and Villa Azagury are examples.

This generation of independence architects were inspired by the schools of Le Corbusier, Richard Neutra, Walter Gropius, Oscar Niemeyer, and others. Their architecture—and the work of Jean-François Zevaco in particular—was experimental, as evidenced in constructions such as the Vincent Timsit Workshops or the Sunna Mosque.

Schools 
As access to education was tightly controlled under the French Protectorate, the educational system in Morocco became a focal point. Michel Ragon noted that only half of the Moroccan population had access to formal education, and so many new schools were built. Their architecture reflected a reëxaminaiton of the constitution of school campuses and classrooms. Zevaco built schools in Brutalist style, such as the Théophile Gautier School and the Tit Mellil Rehabilitation Center. Azagury, too, innovated in his designs for the Longchamp School and the Roches Noires School (now the Ibrahim Roudani School), experimenting with patios and reëxamining the traditional layout of a classroom. He also drew on his experiences in Europe and experimented with contrast in materials and lighting.

Public facilities 
As the economy transformed, industrial buildings, such as the Postal Sorting Center at Mohamed Diouri Square and the Sidi Othmane Wholesale Market (1976-79) of Abdeslam Faraoui and Patrice de Mazières, were constructed according to new Brutalist principles of minimalism and efficiency.

Mourad Ben Embarek designed the Mohammed V International Airport and the Atlas Tower.

Under Hassan II, Casablanca went through two major "neo-Haussmanian" projects: the Hassan II Mosque and the Royal Avenue project.

Neoliberal architecture 
Koenraad Bogaert discusses recent urban projects in Casablanca in their relationship to the politics of Neoliberalism. Villes Sans Bidonvilles is a UN-Habitat program established in the aftermath of the 2003 Casablanca bombings for the resettlement of slum-dwellers.

Casa Marina, Anfa Park, and Casanearshore, are business parks for offshoring.

The neighborhood of the former Casablanca–Anfa Airport transformed into Casablanca Finance City, part of a 2010 economic initiative oriented toward sub-Saharan African nations. Morphosis Architects designed the Casablanca Finance City Tower, with its textured aluminum facade. The French architecture firm  is involved in this project as well as the Zenata "eco cité".

Notable buildings and structures

Government and municipal 
As the economic capital of Morocco, Casablanca is home to many government and municipal buildings. These buildings include but are not limited to:

Palace of Justice
 Wilaya Building, designed by Marius Boyer
The Post Office (مكتب البريد)
Bank al-Maghreb (بنك المغرب)
Old Abattoirs

Religious buildings 
Casablanca is home to many religious buildings as part of its diverse heritage.

Synagogues 

Ettedgui Synagogue
Beth-El Synagogue

Mosques 

 Hassan II Mosque, designed by Michel Pinseau
 Al-Quds Mosque, formerly a Neo-Gothic church called  
Sunna Mosque, designed by Jean-François Zevaco
Al-Mohammadi Mosque, designed by Edmond Brion and

Churches 

Church of San Buenaventura 
Church of the Sacred Heart (1930–1953), designed by Paul Tournon
Notre-Dame de Lourdes Church

Education 
Casablanca is home to a number of academic institutions, including:

 Lycée Ibn Toumart (1929), designed by Georges Jean Grel
 Lycée Lyautey

Transportation 

 Casa-Port Railway Terminal
Casa-Voyageurs Railway Station
Casablanca Tit Mellil Airport
Mohammed V International Airport

Cinemas and theaters 

 Cinema Rialto
 Cinema Lynx
Ciname Empire
Cinema ABC
Cinema Vox
 Grand Theatre of Casablanca
  (1922-1984)

Residential buildings

Apartment buildings 

 Maret Building
 Liberty Building
IMCAMA Building
 Maréchal Améziane Complex
Glawi Building
Assayag Building

Private villas 

 Villa Zevaco
 Villa Camembert
 Villa Suissa
 Villa Azagury
 Villa Moqri

Sports 

 Mohammed V Athletic Complex
 Larbi Benbarek Stadium

 (demolished)

Skyscrapers 

Liberty Building
Atlas Tower
Habous Tower
Novotel
Sofitel
Twin Center
Casablanca Finance City Tower

Preservation of architectural heritage 
Casamémoire is an organization dedicated to the promotion and protection of Casablanca's architectural heritage.

MAMMA. is dedicated to the appreciation and protection of Casablanca's Modernist and Brutalist architecture.

See also 
 List of monuments in Casablanca
 Moroccan architecture
 Architecture of Fez
 Landmarks of Marrakesh

References

Further reading 
 
 
 
Casablanca
Architecture in Morocco
Postcolonialism
Art Deco architecture
Brutalist architecture
Modernist architecture
Moorish Revival architecture